Grevillea treueriana, also known as Mount Finke grevillea, is a shrub that is endemic to Mount Finke in South Australia. It is listed as vulnerable under the EPBC Act.

Description
The species grows to about 2 metres in both height and width. It has deeply lobed leaves with sharp points  and produces bright, orange-red "toothbrush" flowers  in winter and spring.

Taxonomy
Grevillea treueriana was first formally described by botanist Ferdinand von Mueller, the description  published in Fragmenta Phytographiae Australiae in 1875. The specific epithet honours Adolph von Treuer, a German Consul to Australia in the 19th century.

Cultivation
This species prefers a dry climate and well drained soil, but can be grafted on to rootstocks of Grevillea robusta or Grevillea  'Poorinda Royal Mantle' to enable cultivation in areas with higher humidity and rainfall. Plants can be propagated by taking cuttings from current seasons growth, or from seed which has been nicked with a sharp knife.

References

treueriana
Flora of South Australia
Proteales of Australia
Garden plants of Australia
Vulnerable flora of Australia
Taxa named by Ferdinand von Mueller
Plants described in 1875